Bombuzal is a puzzle video game designed by Antony Crowther (credited as "Ratt" in the game) and David Bishop for Image Works. The game was released in 1988 for the Amiga, Atari ST and Commodore 64. It was also released in 1989 for MS-DOS and Dec, 21 1990 in Japan for the Super Famicom, with the North American version released on August, 1992 renamed as Ka-Blooey.

The game had a sequel/remake available for the Nintendo 64 called Charlie Blast's Territory. Among its notable features was the ability to play using either an overhead or isometric view.

Gameplay

To complete each of its 130 levels, the avatar has to destroy all bombs on the level. It must stand on top of the bomb to light it, then is only able to take one step away before the bomb explodes; it can also pick up and move bombs, but only the ones that are on Rail tiles. Bombs come in different sizes and it is only possible to ignite the smallest kind without dying. In most cases, the bombs have to be set off using a chain reaction to prevent the avatar from being killed in the explosion; at other times, separated small bombs can be destroyed one at a time.
Each Bomb/Mine has a reaction zone. For example, a small bomb will only destroy the tile it's on, but will affect any other Bombs/Mines one tile away in the four main directions. A Large bomb will destroy 13 tiles, and its reaction zone will be one tile farther away than the tiles destroyed in each of the four directions, and diagonally between these four points. The game featured level designs by several gaming celebrities, including Jon Ritman, Andrew Braybrook, Geoff Crammond and Jeff Minter.  Jeff Minter's level blew up to leave behind a llama dropping a pile of dung.

There are also two enemies, Sinister and Dexter, appearing on some levels. These continuously travel along with the level, with Sinister always turning left and Dexter always turning right. Neither Sinister nor Dexter actively pursues the avatar, but contact with either is fatal.

Reception
The game received mixed reviews. It received 97% and 92% ratings from Zzap!64 magazine for the C64 and Amiga versions respectively, compared to a review in Commodore User magazine awarding a mere 49%. The former reviews applaud it as an addictive puzzle game with "cute" graphics, while the latter criticizes gameplay, graphics, and controls.

The game was released by Spotlight Software and distributed by Cinemaware in the compilation BrainBlaster with Xenon 2 for the Amiga. This compilation was reviewed in 1991 in Dragon #165 by Hartley, Patricia, and Kirk Lesser in "The Role of Computers" column. The reviewers gave BrainBlaster 5 out of 5 stars.

The Amiga version of Bombuzal was included as a fully working game on the cover disk of the first issue of Amiga Power.

The Super Famicom incarnation of the game was later scheduled for release on the Online service for the Nintendo Switch console in July 2021.

References

External links
Bombuzal on the Amiga at The Hall of Light (HOL)

Bombuzal at Lemon64
Remake in 3D for PC

1988 video games
Amiga games
Atari ST games
Cancelled ZX Spectrum games
Commodore 64 games
DOS games
Kemco games
Nintendo Switch Online games
Puzzle video games
Single-player video games
Super Nintendo Entertainment System games
Video games about bomb disposal
Video games developed in the United Kingdom
Image Works games